The 1944 Florida Gators football team represented the University of Florida during the 1944 college football season. The season was the fourth for Tom Lieb as the head coach of the Florida Gators football team. The highlights of the season included the Gators' 13–6 homecoming victory over the Maryland Terrapins and their 13–0 shutout of the in-state rival Miami Hurricanes on the Hurricanes' home field. The Gators also scored solid victories over teams from two U.S. Naval Air Stations in nearby Jacksonville. Lieb's 1944 Florida Gators finished with a 4–3 overall record and a 0–3 record in the Southeastern Conference (SEC), placing tenth among twelve SEC teams.`

Schedule

References

Florida
Florida Gators football seasons
Florida Gators football